Lia Cook (born 1942) is an American fiber artist noted for her work combining weaving with photography, painting, and digital technology. She lives and works in Berkeley, California and is known for her weavings which expanded the traditional boundaries of textile arts. She has been a professor at California College of the Arts since 1976.

Early life and education 
Lia Cook was born November 24, 1942 in Ventura, California to James Paul Polese and Esther Miriam Homan. She graduated from the University of California, Berkeley in 1965 and went on to earn a master's degree in 1973. After studying theater at San Francisco State University, Cook received a BA degree in political science from University of California, Berkeley in 1965. During her time there, she studied painting and ceramics, in addition to political science. She went on to receive a MA degree in design from the University of California, Berkeley in 1973. During this time, she studied closely with textile artist, Ed Rossbach. In 1965 Lia travels to Mexico and encounters weaving in Chiapas and Oaxaca, It is during this period that Cook collects and is inspired by these textiles which set fourth her interest for weaving as an artistic practice. In 1967, Lia marries her first husband David Cook and they travel to Sweden together where she studies weaving from Northern Europe and the Soviet Union.

Career 
Cook's work focuses on breaking theories of art, craft, science and technology by combining all aspects in her textiles. Her latest project is about the brain and incorporates how humans physically and emotionally respond to images. Cook is considered a pioneer in her use of the electronic Jacquard loom, which she uses in her own work and in her teaching. Cook has completed several fellowships with the National Endowment for the Arts between 1974 and 1992. In 1976 Cook was commissioned by the Art in Architecture Program Fine Arts Collection U.S. General Service Administration to create "Spatial Ikat III" located at the Frank Hagel Federal Building in Richmond California. Cook was also an artist-in-residence at Pittsburgh University where she worked with TREND (Transdisciplinary Research in Emotion, Neuroscience, and Development) to create a body of work that researched Diffusion Spectrum Imaging. During this period Cook had her brain scanned using Diffusion Spectrum Imaging; these scans would later be incorporated into her textiles which went on display at Perimeter Gallery in 2014. Cook has since been interested with sensory sagacity and discovered that woven imagery activated brain activity most affected by touch.  In 2006, Cook was once again commissioned by the U.S. General Service Administration to produce "Sons and Daughters" at the Joseph F. Weis, Jr. U.S. Courthouse in Pittsburgh Pennsylvania. Her work, Presence/Absence: Touches II, was acquired by the Smithsonian American Art Museum as part of the Renwick Gallery's 50th Anniversary Campaign.

Commissions 

 "Spatial Ikat III" 1976, Art in Architecture Program Fine Arts Collection U.S. General Service Administration, located at Frank Hagel Federal Building, Richmond California.
 "Sons and Daughters" 2006, Art in Architecture Program Fine Arts Collection U.S. General Service Administration, located at Joseph F. Weis, Jr. U.S. Courthouse. Pittsburgh, Pennsylvania.

Major exhibitions 

 Embedded Portraiture, 2004 Perimeter Gallery, Chicago, Illinois
 Galerie Les Drapiers, Liege, Belgium Lia Cook, Icones Jacquard, 2014
 Houston Center for Contemporary Craft
 Material Allusions, March 12, 1996 - July 7, 1996 Smithsonian American Art Museum
 Perimeter Gallery, Chicago, IL Lia Cook, Neuro Nets & Net Works, 2014
 Re-Embodied, 2006 Nancy Margolis Gallery, New York
 San Jose Museum of Quilts and Textiles, San Jose, CA Cerebral Touch: Lia Cook 1980-Now, 2017

Public collections 
 American Museum of Art and Design, NYC
 Art Institute of Chicago Chicago, Illinois
 Art in Embassies Program United States Department of State
 Cleveland Museum of Art Cleveland, Ohio
 Denver Art Museum Denver, Colorado
 French National Collection of Art, Paris, France
 Los Angeles County Museum of Art Los Angeles, California
 Metropolitan Museum of Art, NYC
 Museum of Modern Art, NYC
 National Gallery of Australia Parkes, Australia
 Oakland Museum of California Oakland, California
 Philbrook Museum of Art
 Racine Art Museum
 Rhode Island School of Design Museum
 Smithsonian American Art Museum Washington, D.C.
 Textile Museum (George Washington University) Washington, D.C.
 Toms Pauli Foundation, Lausanne, Switzerland

Awards and nominations 
 1974, 1977, 1986, 1992 - Fellowships, National Endowment for the Arts
 1990 - Artist's Fellowship Grant, California Arts Council
 1993 - United States/Mexico Creative Artist's Residency, National Endowment for the Arts
 1994 - French Fellowship, National Endowment for the Arts
 1996Distinguished Faculty Award, California Faculty Award, California College of Arts and Crafts
1997American Craft Council College of Fellows
 1998Distinguished Alumnus Award, University of California, Berkeley
 2000Flintridge Foundation Fellowship
 2003Artist's Fellowship Grant, California Arts Council
 2008Gold Medal Award, Lausanne to Beijing 5th International Fiber Art Biennale Exhibition, Beijing, China
 2010Artist Residence TREND group, Transdisciplinary Research in Emotion, Neuroscience and Development, Department of Psychiatry, University of Pittsburgh School of Medicine
 2011Center for Cultural Innovation, Investing in Artists grant for Artistic Innovation
 2012Smithsonian Artist Research Fellowship (SARF)

References

External links 

 Lia Cook profile on Craft in America
 Lia Cook: On the Loom of Contradiction from  American Craft Magazine

1942 births
Living people
American weavers
Textile artists
American women artists
California College of the Arts faculty
San Francisco State University alumni
UC Berkeley College of Letters and Science alumni
Women textile artists
American women academics
21st-century American women